Abdul Najim Haidary (born 26 December 1999) is an Afghan international footballer who plays as a defender for ENAD in Cyprus. From January to August 2022, he played for the Dutch ASWH.

Career statistics

Club

Notes

International

References

1999 births
Living people
Afghan footballers
Afghanistan international footballers
Afghan expatriate sportspeople in the Netherlands
Association football defenders
Tweede Divisie players
Excelsior Rotterdam players
BVV Barendrecht players
FC Den Bosch players
Sportspeople from Kabul
Afghan expatriate footballers
Expatriate footballers in the Netherlands
ASWH players